The 1948 Cal Aggies football team represented the College of Agriculture at Davis—now known as the University of California, Davis—as a member of the Far Western Conference (FWC) during the 1948 college football season. Led by Vern Hickey in his ninth and final season as head coach, the Aggies compiled an overall record of 5–4 with a mark of 1–3 in conference play, tying for fourth place in the FWC. The team was outscored by its opponents 175 to 98 for the season. The Cal Aggies played home games at A Street field on campus in Davis, California. 

In nine years under Hickey, the Cal Aggies compiled an overall record of 23–42–8, for a winning percentage of .370. The Aggies shared one conference title under Hickey, 1947.

Schedule

Notes

References

Cal Aggies
UC Davis Aggies football seasons
Cal Aggies football